The 1927 NYU Violets football team was an American football team that represented New York University as an independent during the 1927 college football season. In their third year under head coach Chick Meehan, the team compiled a 7–1–2 record.

Schedule

References

NYU
NYU Violets football seasons
NYU Violets football